Deepak Giri is a member of 2nd Nepalese Constituent Assembly. He won Dang–5 seat in 2013 Nepalese Constituent Assembly election from Nepali Congress. He became the irrigation minister of Prachanda Cabinet. 

In the 2022 Nepalese general election, he was elected as the member of the 2nd Federal Parliament of Nepal.

References

Nepali Congress politicians from Lumbini Province
Living people
Members of the 2nd Nepalese Constituent Assembly
Nepal MPs 2022–present
1962 births